Parayi Petta Panthirukulam, is a popular folktale in Kerala. According to this folktale, Vararuchi, one of the nine wise men of Emperor Vikramaditya’s (57 BCE- 78 AD) court married Panchami, a girl belonging to Paraya, a lower caste. The couple set out a long pilgrimage. On the way, they were blessed with 12 children. Upon each delivery, Vararuchi enquired whether the baby had a mouth. If the wife said "yes", he would say, "God will appease the one with mouth" and would ask the wife to abandon the baby then and there and proceed. Eleven children were deserted, since they had a mouth. The tale goes that after the 12th birth, when Vararuchi asked whether the child had a mouth, the wife said he didn't have a mouth in the hope that she may get to raise at least that child. But when she looked at child after saying that, the child indeed was seen to have born without a mouth. Vararuchi consecrated the 12th child as a deity on top of a hill, and they proceeded on the pilgrimage. 

The 11 abandoned children were adopted and brought up by 11 different families, from various sections of society. Following are the name of the families who are believed to have adopted the children: 
Mezhathol Agnihothri (Namboothiri)
Pakkanar (Parayan)
 Rajakan (Washerman)
Naranath Bhranthan [(A divine person who pretend to be mad)Ambalavasi Caste]
 Karakkalamma (Royal Kshathriya woman, only girl born to the couple)
 Akavoor Chathan (Farmer, later became a caretaker)
Vaduthala Nair (Nair Soldier)
Vallon (Pulaya)
 Uppukottan (Muslim trader)
 Paananaar (folk musician)
Perumthachan (Engineer, Architect)
 Vayillakkunnilappan, (Hill Lord without mouth) the 12th child was born without a mouth. Vararuchi consecrated this child on a hill in Palakkad district of Kerala, which is now known as "Vaayillaakkunnilappan temple" located at Kadampazhipuram.

People with the family names and caste affiliations accounted in the folktale, who are believed to be the descendants of Vararuchi, live in Shoranur, Pattambi and Thrithala of Palakkad district of Kerala state. Despite the huge difference in their caste and social ranks, these families are traditionally bound together by rituals and religious customs.

Malayalam poem
The following verses in Malayalam of anonymous authorship and of uncertain date describes the names of the twelve children of Vararuchi and his wife Panchami who comprise the progenitors of the twelve clans of the legend of Panthirukulam.

"മേളത്തോളഗ്നിഹോത്രി രജകനുളിയന്നൂർത്തച്ചനും 
പിന്നെ വള്ളോൻ വായില്ലാക്കുന്നിലപ്പൻ 
വടുതല മരുവും നായർ കാരക്കൽ മാതാ 
ചെമ്മേ കേളുപ്പുകൂറ്റൻ 
പെരിയ തിരുവരംഗത്തെഴും പാണാനാരും 
നേരേ നാരായണഭ്രാന്തനുമുടനകവൂർചാത്തനും
പാക്കനാരും."

mēḷattōḷagnihōtrī rajakanuḷiyannūr -
          ttaccanuṃ pinně vaḷḷōn
vāyillākkunnilappan vaţutala maruvuṃ
          nāyar kārackal mātā
cěmmē kēḷuppukūṛṛan pěriya tiruvara-
          ŋgattěļuṃ pāṇanāruṃ
nērē nāraayaṇabhrāntanumuţanakavūr-
          ccāttanuṃ pākkanāruṃ

References

External links
Panthirukulam
Twelve Names of Panthirukulam

Culture of Kerala